BIA or Bia may refer to:

Acronym or abbreviation

Organizations and companies
 Board of Immigration Appeals, an American immigration appellate court
 Bohemia Interactive Australia, a computer simulation software company
 Border and Immigration Agency, a defunct British government agency
 Braille Institute of America, a non-profit organization headquartered in Los Angeles
 Brazilian Intelligence Agency
 Bridgeport International Academy, a U.S. high school
 British Institute in Amman, a British research institute in Amman, Jordan
 British Island Airways, a defunct British airline
 Brunei Investment Agency, a corporation under the Government of Brunei
 Bureau of Indian Affairs, an American government agency
 Burma Independence Army, a name for the predecessor of the Burma National Army in World War II
 Bus Industries of America
 Security Intelligence Agency, Serbian Security Intelligence Agency
 Beijing Institute of Aerodynamics, a former research organization in Beijing, China

Airports
 Baghdad International Airport
 Bahrain International Airport
 Bandaranaike International Airport
 Bangkok International Airport (disambiguation)
 Bangor International Airport, Bangor, Maine 
 Bastia – Poretta Airport (IATA: BIA), on the island of Corsica
 Beirut International Airport
 Belfast International Airport
 Bengaluru International Airport, Bangalore, India
 Birmingham Airport, Birmingham, England
 Birmingham–Shuttlesworth International Airport, Birmingham, Alabama, United States
 Blackpool International Airport, Lancashire, England
 Bristol Airport
 Brussels International Airport

Other acronyms
 Bankruptcy and Insolvency Act, the statute that regulates the law on bankruptcy and insolvency in Canada
 Basic indicator approach, a set of operational risk measurement techniques for banking institutions
 Behavioural investigative advisor, a British term for police psychologist
 Bilateral Immunity Agreement, a type of treaty involving the United States
 Bioelectrical impedance analysis, a way to measure body fat using electrical impulses
 Burned-in address, a globally unique network address assigned to a device at time of manufacture
 Business impact analysis, a component of business continuity planning
 Business improvement area, a defined area within which businesses pay an additional tax or fee in order to fund improvements within the area
 Business–IT alignment, a dynamic state in which a business organization is able to use information technology (IT) effectively to achieve business objectives

Places 
 Bīā, a village in Iran
 Bia, Togo, a village
 Bia District, a former district of western Ghana
 Bia National Park, a national park in Ghana
 Bia (Ghana parliament constituency)
 Bia River in western Africa
 Phou Bia, the highest mountain in Laos

People 
 Bia (rapper)
 Bïa, a Brazilian-born singer
 Beatriz Vaz e Silva (commonly known as Bia; born 1985), Brazilian soccer player
 Bia de' Medici (1536–1542), daughter of Cosimo I de' Medici, Grand Duke of Tuscany
 Maria Francisca Bia, 19th-century Dutch ballet dancer, opera singer and actress
 Bia (Brazilian footballer)

Other uses 
 Bia (butterfly), a genus of brush-footed butterflies
 Bia (mythology), a Greek mythological figure
 Bia (plant), a genus of plants
 Bia, a synonym for a genus of beetles, Bius
 Bia (TV series), an Argentine telenovela
 Bia, a Filipino name for the Long-finned goby

See also 
 Biar (disambiguation)